Shashwat Rawat (born 6 April 2001) is an Indian cricketer. He made his Twenty20 debut on 4 November 2021, for Baroda in the 2021–22 Syed Mushtaq Ali Trophy. Prior to his Twenty20 debut, he was named in India's squad for the 2020 Under-19 Cricket World Cup. He made his List A debut on 8 December 2021, for Baroda in the 2021–22 Vijay Hazare Trophy.

References

External links
 

2001 births
Living people
Indian cricketers
Baroda cricketers
Place of birth missing (living people)